Chaand Ke Paar Chalo is a 2006 Bollywood film directed by Mustafa Engineer released in 2006. This was Engineer's first film.

Synopsis
The main protagonist is Chander, a tourist photographer in the Indian city of Nainital living with his parents, and best friend Johnny. While on his way to work, he meets a stage dancer (a banjaran) named Nirmala [played by Preeti Jhangiani] and is seduced by her beauty. He takes photographs of her and later befriends her, serenading her with sweet nothings about "taking her across the moon and stars" and promises to take her to the city of dreams, Mumbai. She agrees to be with him, despite objections from her guardians, her uncle and aunt who had other plans for her. From there her career as a star begins under a new name, Garima.

Chander sells his camera to Johnny, as well as his studio to raise money for the realization of their dreams. A film director named Arman Khan discovers Garima and gives her the lead role in his film. Garima attains fame and wealth and eventually starts to cold-shoulder Chander. Her assistant Kapoor dislikes Chander and plots to get rid of him. He succeeds in getting Chander thrown out of Garima's house. Chander's friend advises him to return to Nainital. Upon his return, Chander learns that his father has died and that his mother is staying with his old friend Johnny. Johnny advises Chander to start fresh and returns his camera. Chander returns to his old job. Eventually, he runs into Garima and pleads with her to take him back. She eventually agrees and they get back together.

Cast
Sahib Chopra as Chander
Preeti Jhangiani as Nirmala a.k.a. Garima
Shakti Kapoor as Kapoor
Himani Shivpuri as Nirmala's aunt
Alok Nath as Chander's father
Sanjay Narvekar as Johny
Razzak Khan as Mulla
Kannu Gill as Chander's mother
Tej Sapru as Nirmala's uncle
Raja Awasthi as Pandit
Upasna Singh as Lag
Navin Bawa as Deepak
Yusuf Hussain as Armaan Khan

Soundtrack 

The music of the film is composed Vishnu Narayan & Lyrics penned By ''Rishi Azad. The soundtrack was released 2006 Saregama Music by which consists of 8 songs.

The full album is recorded by Kumar Sanu, Udit Narayan, Alka Yagnik, Shreya Ghosal, Jaspinder Narula, Kalpana, Karsan Sagathia & Aftab Hasmi Sabri

References

External links
 
 Chand ke Paar Chalo in smashits.com

2000s Hindi-language films
2006 films